Penny Barg (born April 11, 1964) is a retired tennis player from the U.S. She is also known as Penny Barg-Mager.

Tennis career
During her career Penny Barg, a former champion of the Orange Bowl Junior Singles, won three WTA doubles titles. She also reached the doubles quarterfinals at Wimbledon and the US Open with her partner Beth Herr.

References

External links
 
 

1964 births
Living people
American female tennis players
Wimbledon junior champions
Grand Slam (tennis) champions in girls' doubles
21st-century American women